Desterro e Carnaval (Portuguese for "Exile and Carnival") is the twelfth studio album by the Brazilian musician Rogério Skylab; the final installment of what he calls the "Trilogia dos Carnavais" (Trilogy of the Carnivals). It was self-released in 2015, and unlike Skylab's previous albums, it didn't see a physical release, being only available through digital download; a trend which would continue for his subsequent outputs. The album counted with guest appearances by Arrigo Barnabé, Michael Sullivan, Fausto Fawcett and Tavinho Paes.

"Lívia" is a Portuguese-language version of "Delia's Gone", an American folk song popularized by Johnny Cash. "Mariana" is fully sung in French.

Critical reception
Writing for Galeria Musical, Felipe Lucena gave Desterro e Carnaval the maximum score of 5 stars out of 5, calling it a "delicate and sensitive output" with "reflexive and melancholic lyrics". Conversely, Raul Lima de Albuquerque of Coliseu de Ideias spoke very negatively of the album, calling it "uneven [...] the worst installment of the Trilogia dos Carnavais; definitely inferior to its predecessor [...] weak and uninspired", ultimately rating it with a 3 out of 10. He also criticized the fact that the album didn't receive a physical release, but considered its production "the only good thing about it".

Track listing

Personnel
 Rogério Skylab – vocals, production
 Luiz Antônio Gomes – keyboards, piano, percussion, mixing, mastering
 Adelson Viana – accordion (track 11)
 Filipe Bohlke – flute (tracks 3 and 9)
 Gesiel Nascimento – flugelhorn (track 2)
  – additional vocals (track 3)
 Michael Sullivan – additional vocals (track 5)
 Arrigo Barnabé – additional vocals (track 15)
 João Gevaerd – additional vocals (track 16)
 Micheline Cardoso – additional vocals (track 16)
 Tavinho Paes – additional vocals (track 16)
 João Linhares – additional vocals (track 16)
 Fausto Fawcett – additional vocals (track 17)
 Solange Venturi – cover art

References

2015 albums
Rogério Skylab albums
Self-released albums
Sequel albums
Obscenity controversies in music
Albums free for download by copyright owner